
The year 771 (DCCLXXI) was a common year starting on Tuesday (link will display the full calendar) of the Julian calendar. The denomination 771 for this year has been used since the early medieval period, when the Anno Domini calendar era became the prevalent method in Europe for naming years.

Events 
 By place 

 Europe 
 December 4 – King Carloman I, youngest son of Pepin III ("the Short"), dies (of a severe nosebleed, according to one source) at the Villa of Samoussy, leaving his brother Charlemagne sole ruler of the now reunified Frankish Kingdom. Gerberga, the widow of Carloman, flees with her two sons to the court of King Desiderius of the Lombards, at Pavia.
 Charlemagne repudiates his Lombard wife Desiderata, daughter of Desiderius, after one year of marriage. He marries the 13-year-old Swabian girl Hildegard, who will bear him nine children. Desiderius, furious at Charlemagne, plans a punitive campaign against the Franks and Rome.

 Britain 
 King Offa of Mercia defeats the Haestingas, and joins their little region to his sub-kingdom of Sussex.Simeon of Durham's. History of the Kings, p. 450

Births 
 Al-Hakam I, Muslim emir of Córdoba (d. 822)
 Ubaydallah ibn al-Mahdi, Abbasid prince and Politician (d. 810)
 Constantine VI, emperor of the Byzantine Empire (d. 797)

Deaths 
 December 4 – Carloman I, king of the Franks (b. 751)
 Amir Kror Suri, also known as Jahan Pahlawan, is a fictional character in Pashtun history (approximate date) 
 Coirpre mac Fogartaig, king of Brega (Ireland)
 Fujiwara no Nagate, Japanese nobleman (b. 714)
 Remigius of Rouen, illegitimate son of Charles Martel

References